evimed GmbH is a German information service provider in the field of health care. The company offers software for the management of medical patient data. The software provided by evimed supports and automates processes of patient recruitment and feasibility studies as well as monitoring and documentation of clinical trials.

History 
evimed was founded in Cologne in August, 2009. The company aims to improve the processes of patient recruitment in order to support the processing of clinical studies. Patient data are being stored in a database-driven system and can be matched for application in given studies based on matching appropriate medical parameters.	

In February 2010, the company launched the world's biggest cancer database for individual therapy to date.

In 2014, evimed relocated to Frankfurt am Main (Hesse).

Service 
evimed offers software for patient data management for clinical studies. The computer-based management of patient data significantly reduces the complexity of data handling for clinical research centers and physicians, offering automated matching of patient data with defined parameters for any given clinical study.
The software is built upon modular structures, offering functionality for clinical feasibility studies, as well as documentation and monitoring. Automated data matching allows for an exact choice of patient-specific parameters, linking it to the specific requirements of given studies. The software thus heads way for personalized medical treatment.

References

External links 
 Website of evimed GmbH

Health care companies of Germany
Medical and health organisations based in Hesse